Three Fathers for Anna is a 1939 German comedy film directed by Carl Boese and starring Ilse Werner, Hans Stüwe and Theodor Danegger.

It was made by the German company UFA at the firm's Berlin studios, with some location shooting taking place around Passau in Bavaria.

Synopsis
A ship's doctor has a young woman placed in his care when her mother dies at sea. Her real father may be one of three men living in a rural Bavarian village.

Cast
 Ilse Werner as Anna
 Hans Stüwe as Dr. Bruck
 Theodor Danegger as Herr Ameiser
 Josefine Dora as Frau Ameiser
 Beppo Brem as Herr Fenzl
 Karel Stepanek as Matschek
 Roma Bahn as Donka
 Irmgard Hoffmann as Frau Fenzl
 Georg Vogelsang as Gsodmair
 Tonio Riedl as Martl
 Josefine Berger as Mareile
 Anneliese von Eschstruth as Gräfin Weißenfels
 Lothar Glathe as Schuckert, Matrose

References

Bibliography

External links 
 

1939 comedy films
German comedy films
1939 films
Films of Nazi Germany
1930s German-language films
Films directed by Carl Boese
UFA GmbH films
Films set in Bavaria
Seafaring films
German black-and-white films
1930s German films